In probability theory, a branch of mathematics, white noise analysis, otherwise known as Hida calculus, is a framework for infinite-dimensional and stochastic calculus, based on the Gaussian white noise probability space, to be compared with Malliavin calculus based on the Wiener process. It was initiated by Takeyuki Hida in his 1975 Carleton Mathematical Lecture Notes.

The term white noise was first used for signals with a flat spectrum.

White noise measure
The white noise probability measure  on the space  of tempered distributions has the characteristic function

Brownian motion in white noise analysis 
A version of Wiener's Brownian motion  is obtained by the dual pairing

 

where  is the indicator function of the interval . Informally

 

and in a generalized sense

Hilbert space 
Fundamental to white noise analysis is the Hilbert space

 

generalizing the Hilbert spaces  to infinite dimension.

Wick polynomials 

with normalization

 

entailing the Itô-Segal-Wiener isomorphism of the white noise Hilbert space  with Fock space:

 

The "chaos expansion"

 

in terms of Wick polynomials corresponds to the expansion in terms of multiple Wiener integrals. Brownian martingales  are characterized by kernel functions  depending on  only by a "cut off":

Gelfand triples 

 

Examples are the Hida triple, with

 

or the more general Kondratiev triples.

T- and S-transform 
Using the white noise test functions

 

one introduces the "T-transform" of white noise distributions  by setting

 

Likewise, using

 

one defines the "S-transform" of white noise distributions  by

 

It is worth noting that for generalized functions ,  the S-transform is just

 

Depending on the choice of Gelfand triple, the white noise test functions and distributions are characterized by corresponding growth and analyticity properties of their S- or T-transforms.

Characterization theorem
The function  is the T-transform of a (unique) Hida distribution  iff for all  the function  is analytic in the whole complex plane and of second order exponential growth, i.e. where  is some continuous quadratic form on .The same is true for S-transforms, and similar characterization theorems hold for the more general Kondratiev distributions.

Calculus 
For test functions , partial, directional derivatives exist:

 

where  may be varied by any generalized function . In particular, for the Dirac distribution  one defines the "Hida derivative", denoting

 

Gaussian integration by parts yields the dual operator on distribution space

 

An infinite-dimensional gradient

 

is given by

 

The Laplacian  ("Laplace–Beltrami operator") with

 

plays an important role in infinite-dimensional analysis and is the image of the Fock space number operator.

Stochastic integrals 
A stochastic integral, the "Hitsuda-Skorohod integral" can be defined for suitable families  of white noise distributions as a Pettis integral

 

generalizing the Itô integral beyond adapted integrands.

Applications 
In general terms, there are two features of white noise analysis which have been prominent in applications.

First, white noise is a generalized stochastic process with independent values at each time. Hence it plays the role of a generalized system of independent coordinates, in the sense that in various contexts it has been fruitful to express more general processes occurring e.g. in engineering or mathematical finance, in terms of white noise.

Second, the characterization theorem given above allows various heuristic expressions to be identified as generalized functions of white noise. This is particularly effective to attribute a well-defined mathematical meaning to so-called "functional integrals". Feynman integrals in particular have been given rigorous meaning for large classes of quantum dynamical models.

Noncommutative extensions of the theory have grown under the name of quantum white noise, and finally, the rotational invariance of the white noise characteristic function provides a framework for representations of infinite-dimensional rotation groups.

References 

Stochastic calculus
Generalized functions